Aramayo is a surname. Notable people with the surname include: 

Carlos Víctor Aramayo (1889–1981), Bolivian industrialist and politician
Carlos Aramayo (alpine skier) (born 1972), Bolivian skier
Manuel Aramayo (1955–1999), Bolivian skier
Omar Aramayo (born 1947), Peruvian poet and composer
Robert Aramayo (born 1992), English actor